Florence Miller may refer to:
 Florence Miller (cricketer) (born 2004), English cricketer
 Florence Miller (writer) (1854–1935), English journalist, author and social reformer
 Florence Clark Miller (1889–1967), British geographer
 Florence Miller Pierce (1918–2007), American artist
 Phebe Florence Miller (1889-1979), Canadian writer

See also
 Florene Miller Watson (1920–2014), American aviator and educator